Samuel Stillman Berry (March 16, 1887 – April 9, 1984) was an American marine zoologist specialized in cephalopods.

Early life 

Berry was born in Unity, Maine, but the family home was the Winnecook Ranch in Montana, which had been founded by his father Ralph in 1880. In 1897, he moved with his mother to Redlands, California.

Berry received a B.S. (1909) from Stanford and his M.S. (1910) from Harvard. He then returned to Stanford for his Ph.D. work on cephalopods and got his doctorate in 1913.

Career 

From 1913 until 1915, he worked as a librarian and research assistant at the Scripps Institution for Biological Research in La Jolla, California. This was the last paid employment he ever held in academia—all his later studies and expeditions were financed by the profits from the family ranch in Montana.

From November 1946 to December 1969, Berry published his own journal, Leaflets in Malacology, which primary contained articles which he had written himself. 

Despite his independent status, he became a renowned malacologist, publishing 209 articles and establishing 401 mollusc taxa. His scientific publications dealt with chitons, cephalopods, and land snails. Forty-seven of his published papers were about cephalopods.

Berry also had an interest in horticulture, where he concentrated on the hybridization of irises and daffodils. For some time, from the 1920s until the late 1940s, he ran a horticultural business from Winnecook Ranch, which he had taken over after the death of his father in 1911. In 1917 he became the president of the Winnecook Ranch Company, a post he occupied until his death in 1984.

Works

References

1887 births
1984 deaths
People from Unity, Maine
People from Redlands, California
20th-century American zoologists
American marine biologists
Stanford University alumni
Harvard University alumni
American malacologists
Teuthologists
Marine zoologists